Rosa Luisa DeLauro (born March 2, 1943) is an American politician who has been the U.S. representative for  since 1991. She is a member of the Democratic Party. The district is based in New Haven and includes most of its suburbs. DeLauro is the dean of Connecticut's congressional delegation.

In 2020, DeLauro was selected as chair of the House Appropriations Committee for the 117th Congress, succeeding Nita Lowey and becoming the second woman to hold the position. She co-chaired the House Democratic Steering Committee from 2003 to 2021.

Early life, education, and early political career
DeLauro was born in New Haven, Connecticut, to an Italian-American family, the daughter of Luisa "Louise" (née Canestri), a New Haven alderwoman, and Theodore J. "Ted" DeLauro, an Italian immigrant. She earned her high school diploma from The Academy of Our Lady of Mercy, Lauralton Hall in Milford, Connecticut. She earned a bachelor's degree from Marymount College in Tarrytown, New York, attended the London School of Economics and earned a master's degree in international politics from Columbia University. Before entering the House, DeLauro worked as Senator Chris Dodd's chief of staff and campaign manager, was the executive director of EMILY's List, and coordinated 1988 Democratic presidential nominee Michael Dukakis's tristate area campaign.

U.S. House of Representatives

Elections
In 1990, four-term incumbent U.S. Representative Bruce Morrison of Connecticut's 3rd congressional district retired in order to run for governor of Connecticut. DeLauro sought the open seat and quickly consolidated Democratic support behind her, earning Morrison's endorsement and prompting State Representative Mike Lawlor's withdrawal from the campaign. DeLauro defeated Republican State Senator Thomas Scott 52%–48% in a particularly brutal general election, in which Scott said that DeLauro had kept her maiden name only to appeal to the region's Italian voters, and state Republican chair Richard Foley called DeLauro "Walter Mondale in drag". The campaign was equally combative over policy matters, with both candidates' microphones cut off during a radio debate after repeated attacks over abortion and capital punishment.

The district has since reverted to form, and DeLauro has never faced another contest nearly as close as her first. She has been reelected 16 times, never with less than 56% of the vote.

2006

In 2006, DeLauro was reelected to a ninth term, defeating Republican nominee Joseph Vollano with 76% of the vote.

2008

DeLauro was reelected to a tenth term with 77% of the vote.

2010

DeLauro was reelected to an 11th term with 65% of the vote against Connecticut Republican Party treasurer Jerry Labriola Jr.

2012

DeLauro was reelected to a 12th term with 74.6% of the vote against Republican nominee Wayne Winsley, a former member of the U.S. Navy.

2014

DeLauro was reelected to a 13th term with 67.1% of the vote against Republican nominee James Brown, a high school math teacher.

2016

DeLauro was reelected to a 14th term with 69% of the vote against Republican nominee Angel Cadena, a former candidate for Connecticut State Comptroller.

2018

DeLauro was reelected to a 15th term with 64.6% of the vote against Cadena.

2020

DeLauro was reelected to a 16th term with 58.7% of the vote to Margaret Streicker's 39.8%.

2022

DeLauro was reelected to a 17th term with 56.8% of the vote to Lesley DeNardis's 40.7%.

Tenure 

DeLauro is part of the progressive wing of the Democratic Party and one of the Congressional Progressive Caucus's founding members.

DeLauro is interested in health policy issues, particularly women's health. She has introduced bills aimed at improving cancer treatment and research and women's health policies. As chair of the appropriations subcommittee that funds the Food and Drug Administration, she has criticized the FDA's failures to protect the public from unsafe foods and medical products.

On February 2, 2008, DeLauro endorsed Barack Obama for President.

On October 3, 2008, DeLauro voted a second time for the Emergency Economic Stabilization Act of 2008. She worked to pass the Paycheck Fairness Act. She has urged politicians to be "big thinkers" on universal health care.

On December 17, 2008, the Wall Street Journal reported that DeLauro was "a top contender" for Labor Secretary in the Obama administration. Obama nominated Hilda Solis for the position.

DeLauro was critical of the Stupak-Pitts Amendment, which places limits on taxpayer-funded abortions in the context of the November 2009 Affordable Health Care for America Act.

DeLauro was a supporter of David Bonior in his race against Steny Hoyer for House Majority Whip in 1991, seconding his nomination at a meeting of the Democratic caucus. DeLauro cited their work together during the Iran-Contra scandal, and said that Bonior's "position as whip will not impact the momentum the choice issue has in Congress right now."

DeLauro has spoken about child care, arguing, "It is time to build a permanent child care infrastructure that respects and values women in the workforce" in a July 2021 article published in The American Prospect and on her official website.

Abortion
DeLauro supports abortion rights. As chair of the Labor, Health and Human Services, Education, and Related Agencies Appropriations Subcommittee, she has opposed the Hyde Amendment based on evidence of its discriminatory impact.

In 2006, she voted against the Child Interstate Abortion Notification Act.

Guns
DeLauro has voted for stronger regulation of firearms. In 2006 she voted against the Trigger Lock Amendment that ends the use of funds from the Commerce Department FY2007 Appropriation bill to enforce laws requiring guns to be sold with locks. In 1999 DeLauro voted to increase the amount of time given to perform background checks from 24 hours to 72 hours. In 1998 she voted to increase the minimum gun crime sentence. On January 14, 2013, she introduced a bill allowing for the voluntary surrender of assault-type weapons with compensation in the form of tax credits. She has an F rating from the NRA.

Campaign finance and government reform
In 2010, DeLauro voted for a bill mandating new disclosure requirements for political advertising. She voted against the 527 Reform Act of 2005, an act that put an end to party spending limits for candidates during general elections, and against the 527 Reform Act of 2006. DeLauro also helped to pass the Lobbying and Donation Regulations bill that put in place new regulations on lobbyists and donations to Congress members.

In 2002 DeLauro voted for the Help America Vote Act of 2002. This act provided $3.9 billion to modernize technology and create new programs to reach a higher standard and to make voting an easier process for disabled citizens, military personnel, citizens living abroad, and first-time voters without valid identification. In 2006 DeLauro voted against the Federal Election Integrity Act of 2006, which required voters to show a government-issued photo ID before voting.

Sponsored bills
DeLauro sponsored the Birth Defects Prevention, Risk Reduction, and Awareness Act of 2010 (H.R. 5462). This bill allows the Secretary of Health and Human Services to create a birth defects prevention, risk reduction, and awareness program. The program aims to increase awareness of pregnancy and breastfeeding by starting a nationwide media campaign and provides grants for research on certain exposures that affect pregnancy and breastfed infants. In November 2010, it was received by the Senate and referred to the Committee on Health, Education, Labor, and Pensions. It was not voted on by the Senate.

HR 875
DeLauro introduced HR 875, the Food Safety Modernization Act of 2009. This legislation is aimed at reforming the food safety responsibilities handled by the FDA. The introduction of this bill represents a potential conflict of interest because of her husband Stanley Greenberg's connection to agricultural biotechnology corporation Monsanto.

Hurricane Irene
In August 2011, the 3rd district suffered extreme damage when Hurricane Irene made landfall along the Connecticut coastline. Many homes were destroyed in East Haven and other shore communities and many Connecticut residents lost power for days. When Irene hit the state and during the immediate aftermath, DeLauro was vacationing along Italy's Amalfi Coast and was not anticipated to return until five days after the storm had passed. A Hartford Courant column rated DeLauro's storm response an "F". DeLauro told the New Haven Register she had "no apology for taking a vacation" and being out of state during the storm.

Health care
In July 2014, DeLauro introduced the Sugar-Sweetened Beverages Tax Act, also known as the "SWEET Act", which would impose a one-cent excise tax per teaspoon of caloric sweetener in soda, energy drinks, sports drinks, and sweet teas (roughly nine cents on a 12-ounce soda). "This act is intended to discourage excessive consumption of sugar-sweetened beverages by increasing the price of these products", according to the text of the legislation. DeLauro and other supporters of the act argued that it could help address the national epidemics of obesity and diabetes by discouraging consumers from consuming the products and also raise money to fund prevention, treatment programs, research and dietary education to help reduce the costs of related health problems. The bill was co-sponsored by several House members and progressed on to the House Energy and Commerce committee for Health and the House Ways and Means committee, but went no further. It was opposed by the American Beverage Association and the National Automatic Merchandising Association (NAMA), which said, "People don't support taxes and bans on common grocery items, like soft drinks" and that sweetened beverages "are not the main source of added sugars for children and teens and that a tax on sugary drinks unfairly singles out the industry."

2020 House Appropriations Committee 
After Nita Lowey announced her retirement, DeLauro, Marcy Kaptur and Debbie Wasserman-Schultz were candidates for chair of the Appropriations Committee. DeLauro's caucus chose her to lead the committee in a 148-79 vote in December 2020.

Committee assignments
Committee on Appropriations (ranking member)
Subcommittee on Agriculture, Rural Development, Food and Drug Administration, and Related Agencies
Subcommittee on Labor, Health and Human Services, Education, and Related Agencies (chair)

Caucus memberships
House Democratic Steering and Policy Committee (co-chair for steering) from 2003 to 2021
Populist Caucus
Congressional Arts Caucus
Afterschool Caucuses
Congressional NextGen 9-1-1 Caucus
Congressional Progressive Caucus

Personal life
DeLauro is married to political strategist Stan Greenberg.

DeLauro was treated for ovarian cancer in 1985. She continues to support biomedical research, including efforts to develop a reliable screening test for ovarian cancer.

She is an honorary board member of the National Organization of Italian American Women. She is a leader in the group Catholic Democrats.

Awards
2009 Health Policy Hero Award from the National Center for Health Research
2019 Foremothers Lifetime Achievement Award from the National Center for Health Research

See also
Women in the United States House of Representatives

References

Further reading
Statement of the Hon. Rosa DeLauro on $10 Billion Accenture Government Contract, June 1, 2004, original link

External links

Congresswoman Rosa L. DeLauro official U.S. House website
Rosa DeLauro for Congress

|-

|-

|-

|-

1943 births
20th-century American politicians
20th-century American women politicians
21st-century American politicians
21st-century American women politicians
Alumni of the London School of Economics
Columbia University alumni
Democratic Party members of the United States House of Representatives from Connecticut
Female members of the United States House of Representatives
Living people
American people of Italian descent
Politicians from New Haven, Connecticut
Women in Connecticut politics